Anup Singh (born 14 March 1961) is Geneva based filmmaker, born in Dar-Es-Salaam, Tanzania, East Africa and grew up in a Sikh family of Punjab origin.

Biography
Anup Singh was born on 14 March 1961 in Dar-Es-Salaam, Tanzania. His family fled Tanzania and came to Bombay in 1971. He graduated in literature and philosophy from the Bombay University and from the Film and TV Institute of India, Pune. He directed films for Indian TV, and was a consultant for BBC2. He now teaches at a film school in Geneva.

Filmography

Director

Ekti Nadir Naam (2003) 
Ekti Nadir Naam (The Name of a River) was Anup Singh's first feature-length film was selected in 30 festivals worldwide and won several awards. The film was based on Indian filmmaker Ritwik Ghatak whom Anup Singh considers as his teacher.

Qissa (2013) 
Qissa - The Tale of a Lonely Ghost premiered at Toronto 2013, and was critically acclaimed, hailed by the international press: "stuns its audience", "beyond boundaries", "conjure such intense feelings", "distinctive storytelling". Awards include Best Asian Film by Netpac, the Silver Gateway Award at the Mumbai FF and Best Actress Award at Abu Dhabi FF.

The Song of the Scorpions (2017) 
The Song of Scorpions stars Golshifteh Farahani, Irrfan Khan, Waheeda Rehman and Shashank Arora.

References

Living people
Swiss film directors
1961 births
Tanzanian film directors
People from Dar es Salaam
Tanzanian people of Indian descent
Film people from Geneva